Filipp Yeseyevich Makharadze (9 March 1868 – 10 December 1941) was a Georgian Bolshevik revolutionary and government official.

Life
Born in the village of Shemokmedi (Guria, Georgia), Makharadze studied at the Theological Seminary in Tbilisi and later graduated from the Veterinary Institute of Warsaw (Poland). 

He joined the Social Democratic movement in 1891 and participated in activities in Georgia and Azerbaijan. In 1903, he joined the Caucasian Joint Committee of the Russian Social Democratic Labour Party and played an active role in the 1905 Revolution in the Caucasus; he was allegedly involved in the assassination of the prominent Georgian public figure Ilia Chavchavadze in 1907. 

In 1907–1915, he led various Bolshevik groups in Transcaucasia and, after the February Revolution, he co-founded the Tbilisi Soviet of Workers' Deputies. In April 1917, he was elected as a delegate to the 7th RSDRP(B) Conference and served in the Bolshevik Caucasian Region Committee. In 1919–1920, he led Bolshevik groups resisting the Menshevik government of independent Georgia. After the Soviet takeover of Georgia, he became chairman of the Georgian Revolutionary Committee in February 1921 and then directed the Georgian Central Executive Committee. In 1922, Makharadze was involved in the Georgian Affair and opposed Sergo Ordzhonikidze's designs with respect to Georgia.

Over the next decade, Makharadze headed the Transcaucasian SFSR Gosplan, the Georgian Council of People's Commissars and the Transcaucasian SFSR Central Executive Committee. In 1938, he became the Chairman of the Presidium of Supreme Soviet of the Georgian SSR and later rose to the position of deputy presidium chairman of the USSR Supreme Soviet. He attended the 12th through 18th Congresses of the Communist Party and directed the Institute of Marxism–Leninism.

During his political career, Makharadze also authored a number of works, including monographs on Alexander Pushkin and Maxim Gorky, and books on the history of the Bolshevik revolutionary movement in Transcaucasia (1927), on the Soviets and the struggle for Soviet power in Georgia (1928), on the history of Georgia in the 19th Century (1932), and the history of the workers' and peasants' movement in Georgia (1932).

See also
Georgian Affair
Polikarp Mdivani

References 

1868 births
1941 deaths
20th-century politicians from Georgia (country)
Communist Party of the Soviet Union members
Communist Party of Georgia (Soviet Union) politicians
Revolutionaries from Georgia (country)
Old Bolsheviks
Recipients of the Order of Lenin
People from Guria
People from Kutais Governorate
Russian Social Democratic Labour Party members
Heads of government of the Georgian Soviet Socialist Republic
Transcaucasian Socialist Federative Soviet Republic People